The 2015 Dodge City Law season is the team's second season as a professional indoor football franchise and first as a member of Champions Indoor Football (CIF) in the 2015 season.

The team is owned and operated by Ricky Bertz. The Law play their home games at the United Wireless Arena in Dodge City, Kansas, under the direction of head coach Sean Ponder.

Season summary
The Law's announced schedule for the 2015 season was disrupted when the New Mexico Stars abruptly postponed their entry into the league on February 21, just one week before the season began. On March 3, the Albuquerque-based Duke City Gladiators were announced as a late entry into the league, partially replacing the Stars in the CIF schedule with a plan to play 11 games in 2015. The team's March 14 game was delayed one day to accommodate a high school basketball tournament that relocated to Dodge City.

Off-field moves
The Law earned an 8–4 record in 2014 as an expansion team in the Champions Professional Indoor Football League. They lost to the Wichita Wild in the league championship semi-finals. After the season ended, the CPIFL announced it was merging with teams from other leagues to form Champions Indoor Football.

Awards and honors
Each week of the regular season, the CIF names league-wide Players of the Week in offensive, defensive, and special teams categories. For Week 5, the CIF named quarterback Joshua Floyd as the Offensive Player of the Week and defensive linesman Marquis George as the Defensive Player of the Week. For Week 8, the CIF named kick returner Dominique Carson as one of two Special Teams Players of the Week.

On June 6, the CIF announced the winners of its year-end awards. The Dodge City Law were named Franchise of the Year, honored for Game Operations of the Year, saw owner/general manager Ricky Bertz named Executive of the Year, and had kick returner Dominique Carson sharing the Special Teams Players of the Year honors.

Schedule
Key:

Pre-season

Regular season

 Rescheduled after the New Mexico Stars withdrew from the league on February 22, 2015.
 Rescheduled to accommodate a high school basketball tournament

Roster

Standings

Playoffs

References

External links
Dodge City Law official website
Dodge City Law at Our Sports Central

Season 2015
Dodge City Law
Dodge City Law